The men's 81 kilograms competition at the 2021 World Weightlifting Championships was held on 11 and 12 December 2021.

Schedule

Medalists

Records

Results

New records

References

Results

Men's 81 kg